Scott Ryan Kuhn (born April 16, 1986) is a former American football tight end. He was signed by the Baltimore Ravens as an undrafted free agent in 2008. He played college football at Louisville.

Kuhn was also a member of the Las Vegas Locomotives.

External links
Louisville Cardinals bio

1986 births
Living people
People from Burlington, Kentucky
Players of American football from Kentucky
American football tight ends
Louisville Cardinals football players
Baltimore Ravens players
Las Vegas Locomotives players